Yusupovo (Yosop) is a rural locality (a village) in Kandakovsky Selsoviet, Kiginsky District, Bashkortostan, Russia. The population was 529 as of 2010. There are 6 streets.

Geography 
Yusupovo is located 31 km north of Verkhniye Kigi (the district's administrative centre) by road. Kandakovka is the nearest rural locality.

References 

Rural localities in Kiginsky District